Joginder Pal (born 2 April 1964) is an Indian politician and a member of INC. In 2017, he was elected as the member of the Punjab Legislative Assembly from Bhoa. He is a kind politician as stated by his constituency.When he was in power,he helped many people even now also he still helps whoever approaches him.

Constituency
Pal represents the Bhoa. Pal won the Bhoa on an INC ticket, Pal beat the member of the Punjab Legislative Assembly Seema Kumari of the BJP by over 27496 votes.

Political party
Pal is from the Indian National Congress and he is also the MLA of Bhoa Assembly constituency.

Electoral performance

References

People from Pathankot district
Living people
Punjab, India MLAs 2017–2022
1964 births